

Post-Soviet states

Date
In the Post-Soviet states DD.MM.YYYY format is used with dot as a separator.

Time
24-hour time notation is used officially and for purposes that require precision like announcements in the media. In colloquial speech 12-hour clock is used.

Greater Arabia

Greater China

Date
The date format follows the Chinese hierarchical system, which has traditionally been  big-endian. Consequently, it correlates with ISO 8601 — year first, month next, and day last (e.g. ). A leading zero is optional in practice, but is mostly not used. Chinese characters that mean year, month, and day are often used as separators (e.g. ). Since the characters clearly label the date, the year may be abbreviated to two digits when this format is used. 

The exception to this guideline is in Taiwan, where a separate calendar system is used, with years numbered to the founding of the Republic of China in 1912. Thus, the year 2006 corresponds to the "95th year of the Republic" (or ). In official contexts, this system is always used, while the Gregorian calendar is sometimes used in informal contexts. To avoid confusion, the Gregorian year is always written out in full in Taiwan. For example, 95.01.29 refers to 2006-01-29, not 1995-01-29 (which would be rendered as 84.01.29). Another means to distinguish between the two systems is to place the terms Gōngyuán (common era) and Mínguó (Republic) before the year.

In speech, the date is spoken in the same format as it is written.

      

Hào is a colloquial term used to express the day of the month instead of rì. It is rarely used in formal writing. 

      

Hào is more often used when the month is understood from the context, i.e.:  for the 29th.

Dates written in Hong Kong and Macau are often formatted in the DD.MM.YYYY style due to European influences. Nonetheless, the Chinese form of the dates is still read in the same way as described above.  Visas for the People's Republic of China also conform to this format.

Time

It is not uncommon to see Chinese numerals instead of Arabic numbers, but tourist attractions will usually use Arabic numerals for the convenience of foreigners.

If the minutes of a given time are less than ten, the preceding zero is included in speech.

Both the 12-hour and 24-hour notations are used in spoken and written Chinese. Spoken Chinese predominantly uses the 12-hour system and follows the same concept as A.M. and P.M.. However, these clarifying words precede the time.

A sample of other phrases that are often used to better describe the time-frame of day are listed below:

03:00
  (literally "pre-dawn 3 hours", meaning "3 in the morning")
 (literally "pre-dawn 3 o'clock",  meaning "3 o'clock in the morning")
19:00
  (literally "evening 7 hours",  meaning "7 at night")
  (literally "evening 7 o'clock",  meaning "7 o'clock at night")
Note: As in English, these time-frame phrases are used only with the 12-hour system.

Time can alternatively be expressed as a fraction of the hour. "At the half-hour" is described using , which means half.

6:45

; or 
8:15

9:30 

Attention must be drawn to the time 02:00. Note that this does not apply to either 12:00.

Cantonese has an additional method of expressing time as a fraction of the hour. This system divides the hour into 12 units, each five minutes long. Each unit, therefore, corresponds to one of the numbers written on an analogue clock. This method can be used in two ways - with the relative hour and without. When the relative hour is included, the unit must be preceded with the measure word . When the relative hour is not included, the unit is omitted as well; the position of the minute hand is described instead, using the verb , which literally means "step on", meaning "resting on top of" in this context. Examples:

five-after = 
ten-after = 
fifteen-to = 
ten-to = 

The half-hour mark is never described using this unit of five minutes, however. 3:30 is still , as previously described.

India, Pakistan and Bangladesh

Iran

Japan

Korea

Mongolia

Nepal

Southeast Asia

 Date and time notation in the Philippines
 Date and time notation in Thailand
Date and time notation in Vietnam

Turkey

See also 

Asia
Date and time representation